NGC 3244 is a spiral galaxy in the Antlia constellation discovered by John Herschel on April 22, 1835. A supernova was detected in NGC 3244 on June 27, 2010, designated SN 2010ev. With an apparent magnitude of about 14, it was the third-brightest supernova observed in 2010.

See also 
 New General Catalogue

Gallery

References

External links 
 

Unbarred spiral galaxies
18350422
3244
30594
Antlia